Paracalamobius tonkineus is a species of beetle in the family Cerambycidae, and the only species in the genus Paracalamobius. It was described by Breuning in 1982.

References

Agapanthiini
Beetles described in 1982
Monotypic beetle genera